How We Fought the Emden is a 1915 Australian silent documentary film from cinematographer Charles Cusden about the Battle of Cocos during World War I. It was also known as The Fate of the Emden.

Production
Shortly after the defeat of the Emden during the Battle of Cocos, members of the Millions Club in Sydney formed a Cocos Island Syndicate and organised an expedition to make a film about it.

Release
Footage from the movie was later incorporated into the films How We Beat the Emden (1915) and For the Honour of Australia (1916).

References

External links
Clip from film at Australian Screen Online

1915 films
Australian black-and-white films
Australian silent films
Lost Australian films
Australian World War I films
Australian documentary films
1915 documentary films
World War I naval films
World War I films based on actual events
Films from Australasian Films
1910s English-language films